Lycksjön is a lake in Stockholm County, Södermanland, Sweden.  It lies inside the Tyresta National Park.

Lakes of Stockholm County